Chandra Lal Meche is a Nepalese politician from Jhapa District, belonging to the Communist Party of Nepal.

After the 2008 Constituent Assembly election Meche was not included amongst those elected through the proportional representation vote, something that caused local Maoist activists in Charali to vandalise their party office in protest. Meche was however later nominated to the Constituent Assembly.

Meche is a close friend of Anirban Roy, writer of the best-selling book---Prachanda: The Unknown Revolutionary.

References

Living people
Communist Party of Nepal (Maoist Centre) politicians
Year of birth missing (living people)
Members of the 1st Nepalese Constituent Assembly